Tavarres King (born July 14, 1990) is a former American football wide receiver. He was drafted by the Denver Broncos in the fifth round of the 2013 NFL Draft. He played college football at Georgia.

High school
King attended Habersham Central High School in Mount Airy, Georgia alongside teammate Gabe Irby. He was the RISE Gatorade Georgia Football Player of the Year after finishing his senior season in 2007 with a state-record 1,632 receiving yards and 17 TDs on 99 receptions (16.5 average). He also set a then-school record with 42 catches for 700 yards and 10 touchdowns, and returned a kickoff and a punt for a score as a junior. He finished his career with 207 catches for 3,726 yards and 37 TDs. His father, Anthony King, once held all the rushing records at Habersham Central and later played at Clemson.

Considered  a four-star recruit by Rivals.com, he was rated the No.15 wide receiver prospect in the nation. He accepted a scholarship from Georgia over offers from Clemson, Florida and Georgia Tech.

College career

2008-2012
During his tenure at the University of Georgia, he caught 135 passes for 2,602 receiving yards and 20 touchdowns.

Professional career

Denver Broncos
King was drafted by the Denver Broncos in the fifth round, 161st overall in the 2013 NFL Draft.

Carolina Panthers
King was claimed by the Carolina Panthers on October 21, 2013 after being waived by the Denver Broncos. He was cut August 30, 2014 for final roster cuts before the start of the 2014 season. He was signed to the team's practice squad the next day.

Jacksonville Jaguars
On September 16, 2014, the Jacksonville Jaguars signed King off the Carolina Panthers practice squad to the club’s 53-man roster. He was waived on October 25, 2014.

Tampa Bay Buccaneers
On October 28, 2014, days after being released by Jacksonville when they promoted Peyton Thompson to their active roster, Tampa Bay worked out several wide receivers and signed King to their practice squad. On September 4, 2015, King was released by the Bucs on the final cuts toward the 53-man roster.

New York Giants

On September 30, 2015, King was added to the practice squad of the New York Giants. On January 4, 2016, King signed a reserve/future contract with the Giants.
On January 8, 2017, King scored a touchdown on a 41-yard pass from Eli Manning in the third quarter of the Giants' game against the Green Bay Packers at Lambeau Field in the Wild Card Round of the 2016-17 NFL playoffs. King's score made the game a 2-point game, but the Giants would eventually lose to the Packers 38-13. After the Giants signed wide receiver Brandon Marshall in the 2017 offseason, King changed his jersey number from #15 to #12.

On September 18, 2017, King was released by the Giants. He was re-signed on October 9, 2017 after injuries to multiple receivers on the team. He suffered a concussion in Week 15 and was placed on injured reserve on December 30, 2017, yet he still managed to rack up 240 receiving yards before his injury.

Minnesota Vikings
On April 5, 2018, King signed with the Minnesota Vikings. He was waived/injured on September 1, 2018 and was placed on injured reserve. He was released on October 9, 2018.

Career statistics

References

External links
 Georgia Bulldogs bio

1990 births
Living people
People from Habersham County, Georgia
Players of American football from Georgia (U.S. state)
American football wide receivers
Georgia Bulldogs football players
Denver Broncos players
Carolina Panthers players
Jacksonville Jaguars players
Tampa Bay Buccaneers players
New York Giants players
Minnesota Vikings players